Vijayamangai Vijayanatheswarar Temple is a Hindu temple located at Tiruvijayamangai in Thanjavur district of Tamil Nadu, India.  The presiding deity is Shiva. He is called as Vijayanatheswarar. His consort is known as Mangalanayaki.

Significance 
It is one of the shrines of the 275 Paadal Petra Sthalams - Shiva Sthalams glorified in the early medieval Tevaram poems by Tamil Saivite Nayanars Tirugnanasambandar and  Tirunavukkarasar.

Literary mention 
Tirugnanasambandar describes the feature of the deity as: 

Tirunavukkarasar describes the feature of the deity as:

References

External links 
 
 

Shiva temples in Thanjavur district
Padal Petra Stalam